Adam Eaton (born 2 May 1980) is a former professional footballer, who after starting out as a trainee at Everton, played for Preston North End and Mansfield Town before retiring due to a serious hip injury in 2006.

External links

1980 births
Footballers from Wigan
Living people
Association football defenders
English footballers
Everton F.C. players
Wigan Athletic F.C. players
Preston North End F.C. players
Mansfield Town F.C. players
English Football League players